Henry Tillinghast Sisson (August 20, 1831 – October 19, 1910) was a colonel in the Union Army during the American Civil War, a lieutenant governor of Rhode Island from 1875 to 1877 serving under Governor Henry Lippitt, and inventor of the three-ring binder.

Early life
He was a lifelong resident of Little Compton, Rhode Island, and inherited a stone mansion at Sakonnet Point. The mansion was originally built by his father for use as a hotel and recently has been known as the Stone House Inn.

In 1859, Sisson secured patent no. 23506 for the design of a loose-leaf ring binder.

Civil War service
Sisson was commissioned as a lieutenant and paymaster for the 1st Rhode Island Detached Militia (aka. 1st Rhode Island Volunteer Infantry Regiment) in May 1861 and served until the regiment was mustered out in August 1861. He participated in the Battle of Bull Run on July 21, 1961 under General Ambrose Burnside.

In April 1862 he was commissioned as major of the 3rd Rhode Island Heavy Artillery and commanded three companies (B, F and K) of that regiment at the Battle of Secessionville, South Carolina.

On November 5, 1862 he was promoted to colonel and given command of the 5th Rhode Island Infantry which became the 5th Rhode Island Heavy Artillery on May 27, 1863.   Colonel Sisson was mustered out of service, along with his regiment, on June 26, 1865.

Post-war life
In 1864, he married Nettie Walworth in New Bern, North Carolina; she died in 1868. He then married Emily Josephine Brownell in 1870; they had four children.

He was elected as a Republican to the office of Lieutenant Governor of Rhode Island in 1874 and served from 1875 until 1877.

Death and burial

He died at his mansion in Little Compton on October 19, 1910.  He was buried in a plot in Union Cemetery, across the street from the historic Commons Cemetery in Little Compton, Rhode Island.

About 1919, a life size statue of Colonel Sisson was unveiled in the cemetery by then Massachusetts governor Calvin Coolidge. The bronze statue was designed by Rhode Island sculptor Henri Schonhardt.

References

External links

1831 births
1910 deaths
Union Army colonels
Lieutenant Governors of Rhode Island
Rhode Island Republicans
19th-century American politicians